Mario Chicot, also simply Mario, is a popular zouk singer from Guadeloupe. He became known with the hit Petite fille in 1988, and then had a string of hits in the boom for zouk music in France during the 1990s. In 2011 he released a comeback album Besoin de toi.

References

Guadeloupean musicians
Zouk musicians
French male singers
Living people
20th-century births
Year of birth missing (living people)